The School of Cognitive Sciences forms part of the Institute for Studies in Theoretical Physics and Mathematics (IPM) in Tehran, Iran. The school was called the School of Intelligent Systems (SIS) until 2003 when it was renamed to the School of Cognitive Sciences. The research is predominantly focused on cognitive Neuroscience.

The research programs cover diverse areas including cognitive neuroscience, neural modeling, psychophysics, linguistics, neural networks and artificial intelligence. Since its inception the school has been managed by Prof. Caro Lucas (School of ECE, University of Tehran), Prof. Shahin Rouhani (Physics Department, Sharif University of Technology), Prof. Hossein Esteky (Shahid Beheshti University of Medical Sciences) and most recently by Prof. Mojtaba Zarei (Institute for Medical Science and Technology, Shahid Beheshti University).

The school earned enormous recognition with the publication of the article entitled "Microstimulation of inferotemporal cortex influences face categorization" by Seyed Reza Afraz, Roozbeh Kiani and Hossein Esteky in Nature. The article was published on August 10, 2006.

See also
Institute for Studies in Theoretical Physics and Mathematics

External links
IPM School of Cognitive Sciences

Research institutes in Iran
Cognitive science research institutes